Taherpur is a town and a notified area in Ranaghat subdivision of Nadia district in the Indian state of West Bengal.

History
Taherpur has been named after a certain Pathan fief-holder Tahir Khan. Kamdev Bhatta, a Brahmin of shandilya gotra defeated the Pathan fief-holder Tahir Khan and laid the foundation of the Taherpur zamindari during the independent Sultanate period (1338-1538) of Bengal. 
Kamdev descendant Raja Kangshanarayan of Taherpur organized the first grand autumn Durga Puja in Bengal.

Geography

Location

Area overview
Nadia district is mostly alluvial plains lying to the east of Hooghly River, locally known as Bhagirathi. The alluvial plains are cut across by such distributaries as Jalangi, Churni and Ichhamati. With these rivers getting silted up, floods are a recurring feature. The Ranaghat subdivision has the Bhagirathi on the west, with Purba Bardhaman and Hooghly districts lying across the river. Topographically, Ranaghat subdivision is spread across the Krishnanagar-Santipur Plain, which occupies the central part of the district, and the Ranaghat-Chakdaha Plain, the low-lying area found in the south-eastern part of the district. The Churni separates the two plains. A portion of the east forms the boundary with Bangladesh. The lower portion of the east is covered by a portion of the North 24 Parganas district. The subdivision has achieved reasonably high urbanisation. 41.68% of the population lives in urban areas and 58.32% lives in rural areas.

Note: The map alongside presents some of the notable locations in the subdivision. All places marked in the map are linked in the larger full screen map. All the four subdivisions are presented with maps on the same scale – the size of the maps vary as per the area of the subdivision.

Transport
Taherpur is well connected with district headquarters and Kolkata by road. Taherpur railway station is situated on the Ranaghat–Krishnanagar line.

Civic administration

Police station
Rananghat and Taherpur police stations have jurisdiction over Ranaghat, Birnagar, Taherpur and Ranaghat I CD block. The total area covered by the Taherpur police station is 154.74 km2 and the population covered is 173,926 (2001 census).

Demographics
According to the 2011 Census of India, Taherpur (Notified Area + Out Growth) had a total population of 38,039, of which 19,410 (51%) were males and 18,629 (49%) were females. Population in the age range 0–6 years was 3,200. The total number of literate persons in Taherpur was 30,166 (86.59% of the population over 6 years).

The following municipality, notified area, outgrowths and census towns were part of Shantipur Urban Agglomeration in 2011 census: Shantipur (M), Taherpur (NA), Taherpur (OG), Barasat (OG), Bhaduri (OG), Mahisdanga (OG), Phulia (CT), Patuli (CT), Badkulla (CT), Ghoralia (CT), Beharia and Gangni.

 India census, Taherpur had a population of 20,060. Males constitute 51% of the population and females 49%. Taherpur has an average literacy rate of 80%, higher than the national average of 59.5%: male literacy is 84%, and female literacy is 76%. In Taherpur, 9% of the population is under 6 years of age.

References

Cities and towns in Nadia district